The Yemeni mouse (Ochromyscus yemeni) is a species of rodent in the family Muridae.
It is found in Saudi Arabia and Yemen. It is the only modern member of the tribe Praomyini to be found outside of Africa.

It was initially described as a subspecies of Myomys fumatus in its 1953 description by Colin Campbell Sanborn and Harry Hoogstraal.

Some parasites found on this species include the mite Laelaps nuttalli. and the flea Xenopsylla cheopis.

References

Further reading

 
 

Ochromyscus
Mammals described in 1953
Mammals of the Arabian Peninsula
Taxonomy articles created by Polbot
Taxa named by Colin Campbell Sanborn
Taxobox binomials not recognized by IUCN